Aboriginal breastplates (also called king plates or aboriginal gorgets) were a form of regalia used in pre-Federation Australia by white colonial authorities to recognise those they perceived to be local Aboriginal leaders. The breastplates were usually metallic crescent-shaped plaques worn around the neck by wearer.

Aboriginal people did not traditionally have kings or chiefs. They lived in small clan groups with several elders—certain older men and women—who consulted with each other on decisions for the group. By appointing kings of tribes, and granting them king plates, colonial authorities went against the more collegiate grain of traditional Aboriginal culture.

Brief history 
In the 19th century, king plates were given by numerous communities in various Australian States to esteemed Aboriginal men and women, who were usually elders of their particular tribal or kinship group. The plates were presented to perceived 'chiefs', courageous men and to faithful servants. There have been suggestions that the presentation of breastplates also had a great deal to do with whether or not the recipient was seen as useful or respected by the white Australian community of the area in question.

The plates were typically made from industrial metals such as brass or iron. A typical format of inscribing the breastplates was to write the recipients name across the upper part of the plate's face, with the title below, sometimes 'King', 'Queen', or 'Chief'.  Some particularly distinguished Aboriginal characters are said to have ironically had the royal seal of Queen Victoria engraved somewhere on the plate to add an extra air of prestige. While some Aboriginal people wore their breastplates with pride, others saw them as yet another insult to their culture from the white European settlers.

The practice of presenting respected Aboriginal leaders with breastplates declined in the post-Federation years, becoming virtually unheard of by the end of the 1930s.

Aboriginal breastplate holders
Little is known about individual Aboriginal people who were awarded breastplates. Some are merely inscribed "King", "Queen", or "Prince", while others are inscribed for some type of service of merit for which they were awarded. There is differing reference to how breastplates were received by Aboriginal people, some wore them proudly, while others destroyed them.

Aboriginal breastplates can be difficult to document and this work is made the more difficult as it is now many decades since they were last worn. Most pre-date living memory, with the majority having been given out between the mid nineteenth and very early twentieth century. Further complicating matters is the change in place names, particularly property names. Many pastoral stations and farms have either been subsumed into larger properties or divided into smaller ones at various times. With this came name changes, with some names disappearing altogether. The bearers of breastplate are important historical figures, however many remain unknown to present and future generations.

ACT 
 Neddy - King of Neis Valley. Note: the Australian Capital Territory used to be part of New South Wales. 'Neis' is now spelt 'Naas'.

New South Wales 

 Albert King of Georges River. Held in the collection of the National Museum of Australia.
 Bagot King of Coodoobluie. Held in a private collection.
 Balderoy Duke of Wallandroo.
 Baraban, Presented to Baraban by Shepherd Laidley in Remembrance of 9 December 1867. Drowning man being saved by swimmer.
 Barabahn or MacGil, Chief of the Tribe at Bartabah on Lake Macquarie: a reward for his assistance in reducing his native tongue to a written language also Biraban.
 Ben Bruce, King.
 Berry to Broughton for digging a canal single handedly a feat no white man could emulate. Held in the Australian Museum collection.
 Biamanga King of Wallagand Bega District, Born Bedboura.
 Bill Wyoming, Brisbane Water. Hawkesbury District of NSW
 Billy Andrews - King of Murwillumbah. Held in private collection.
 Billy Barloo, King of Coldstream.
 Billy Barlow King of Terry Hie Hie 1 January 1914 Presented by J.E. Cory Esq. This breastplate has a partner, see Maggie Barlow.
 Billy Dolly, Chief of Carriwong Creek.
 Billy Elingeit King of the Barweegee Tribe.
 Billy Griffih King of Waradgery 1866. Held in the collection of the Australian Museum.
 Billy Kelly - King of Broadwater.
 Billy King of Ena.
 Billy King of Myrtle Creek. Held in the State Library of NSW collection.
 Billy King of Nanima. Wellington Valley. Held in the Mitchell Library Collection.
 Billy Lambert - Holwood, King's Plains, 1834.
 Billy Moore - the famous Tweed Aboriginal. This breastplate was found in 1920 under a log in Bray's Scrub at Kynnumboon, Murwillumbah, New South Wales. Held in the collection of the Tweed Regional Museum.
 Billy Morgan, King of Dyraaba.
 Billy of Breeza. In the collection of the Australian Museum.
 Black Bob King of Duck Creek. Was once held in the Bungan Castle Museum collection.
 Bluey King of Glenariff. Cobar - Bourke District. Held in the Australian Museum collection.
 Bob de Robin.
 Bobby Chief of the Yugilbar Tribe. In the collection of the National Library of Australia.
 Bobby, King of Bumberin.
 Bobby King of Canargo. In the collection of the Museum of Victoria.
 Bobby King of Grafton.
 Boongong Nimmitt, Chief of the Burrier Tribe, 1847. Dharawal (Wandandian); Gandangara people. Held in the Museum of Applied Arts and Sciences collection.
 Boney King of the Maning Tribe.
 Brandy King of Dungalear Presented by J A Campbell 5 September 1891. Held in a private collection.
 Brandy King of Dungalear Henry Rourke. Held in a private collection.
 Broughton Native Constable Shoalhaven 1822.
 Brummy King of Terry Hie Hie Presented by Alex Bowman. This breastplate has a partner, see Marie Queen of Terry Hie Hie.
 Brungal Tommy King of Brungal the Gift of John Keighrer. Held in a private collection.
 Budd Billy - II, King of Jarvis Bay.
 Budingbru Chief of Twofold Bay. Held in a private collection.
 Bum-Balie Chief of Whalan. halan is north of Moree. In the Australian Museum collection.
 Bungaree (Bungary) - a native chief of New South Wales. His portrait wearing the kingplate was painted by artist Augustus Earle (1793–1838).
 Bunya Jimmey King of the Hastings River.
 Burrawambilly Chief of Bowbow. From the Birpal people, held in the Museum of Applied Arts and Sciences Collection.
 Caomoi Churaki. Held in a private collection.
 Charley, Chief of Merri 5 February 1848. Held in the Mitchell Library Collection.
 Charley King of Burran.
 Charley York - Chief of Bullangamang.
 Chief Herdsman to Mr Rixson of Twofold Bay. Held in a private collection.
 Cobber Bill, King of Goulburn.
 Cobbler King of Mogil Mogil.
 Cobbor Bill King of Goulbum. Lake Milton area. In the collection of the Australian Museum.
 Coburn Jackey - Chief of Burrowmunditroy was a Koori Aboriginal man of the Wiradjuri people in New South Wales. He was presented with his king plate in the 1800s by colonizer James White - one of the first European settlers in the region. The two men were good friends and Jackey provided the pioneering White with much assistance in their time together.
 Cockabundy Chief of Jerricka nora. Held in the Australian Museum collection.
 Cockabundy Chief of Tollwong. Shoalhaven River district. Held in the Australian Museum collection.
 Cockey Chief of Wooleroo Hunter Valley. Held in a private collection.
 Colin King of Wallambata & Byron Plains circa 1850s.
 Coogee King of Georges River.
 Coomee, last of her tribe - Murramarang.
 Cora Gooseberry Freeman Bungaree Queen of Sydney and Botany. There is another plate marked "Gooseberry Queen of Sydney to South Head" which relates to this breastplate. Held in the State Library of NSW collection.
 Cramberlown Charlie. Picton. Held in private collection.
 Cranbukka King of Tamworth. Held in a private collection.
 Cueybaum King of Toogarimbah & Gundurimbah. In the collection of the Richmond River Historical Society
 Dan - Chief of the Wiljakali. Wiljakali is a language name for the people whose country straddles the SA/NSW border in the Silverton/Barrier Range/Mootwingee/Olary region.
 David - King of the Woronora Tribe. Held in a private collection.
 Davey King of New England. Held in the Australian Museum collection.
 Dawalla - King of Wgga [sic] Wagga.
 Dennis - Chief of Morbringer.
 Derry S King of Casino. Was in the collection of the Richmond River Historical Society, now lost.
 Dicky - King of Clyde Road.
 Drumble Charlie, King of the Brunswick Blacks. Held in the Australian Museum collection.
 Dubbo King of Meilmam. South Australian Museum Collection.
 Ellen 1st Queen of Illuka.
 Eve Queen of Wurtimurti.
Flash Jenny King of the Grange. Held in the Clarence River Historical Society collection.
 Frederick King of Gouboulion from Chas Lawson. Bathurst area. Held in the Australian Museum collection.
 George King of Waterview. Refers to Waterview Homestead. Held in private collection.
 George Webster, King.
 Georgy, Mudgee police man - given by Mr Whitling.
 Geroone - Chief of Unanderra.
 Gooseberry Queen of Sydney to South Head. Wife of Bongaree "King of Blacks and Chief of Broken Bay Tribe" There is another plate marked "Cora Gooseberry Freeman Bungaree Queen of Sydney and Botany" which is related to this one.
 Harry King of Burke. Held in a private collection.
 Harry Mulbah Chief of Berrallawah. Held in the Museum of Applied Arts and Sciences collection.
 Henry Bates King of Dundullamall.
Honest Tom, Chief of Greendale Tribe, 1832. Dug up in a garden in Grafton in 1938. Held in the Clarence River Historical Society collection.
 Jack Dunn, King of Cundagin, Presented by J S Drew, Cumbathan Itthan Oban and New England Generally 1909.
 Jack the traveller - King of Bendora Bellevue and Jembicumbane.
 Jack Kibbeen King of Wollongbar. Jack Kabbeen was a chief of the Arakwal tribe, a sub-group of the Bundjalung people.Wollongbah is located on, the plateau between Lismore and Ballina. Provenance: Believed to have been made at O'Flynn's foundry in Victoria Street, Lismore, John P. O'Flynn, the Son of the founder of O'Flynn's foundry, Beaudesert, Queensland, Scott rainbow, Mt. Coolum, Queensland, private collection, New South Wales Jack Kibbeen's breastplate came up for auction in 2009 and requests were denied to return it to his ancestors.
 Jackabone.
 Jackaroo, King of Canobie, Cloncurry River.
 Jackey Lewis. Chief of the Bathurft (sic) Tribe.
 Jackey Jackey. Presented by His Excellency Sir Charles Augustus Fitz Roy Governor NSW to Jackey Jackey. Held in the Mitchell Library collection.
 Jacky King of Youwandah. Held in a private collection.
 Jacky King of Illawarra. Held in the Australian Museum collection.
 Jacob Icely Constable Coombing 1863 Barwon Region. Held in the Australian Museum collection.
 Jacob King of Bathurst Held in a private collection.
 James Fearnought - King of Merigal
 Jemmy Abigail, Chief of the Braidwood Tribe. Held in the Australian Museum collection.
 Jemmy Curraburma 1843. Held in a private collection.
 Jemmy - King of Big River.
 Jemmy - King of Bolara Maneroo. Bolara is/was in the Adaminaby district.
 Jemmy Miles Prince of the Wywandy. Hartley Valley. Held in a private collection.
 Jemmy Muggle -King of Wiggley.
 Jemmy Rawsthorn, King of Grudgery. Grudgery was a station on the Lachlan River, NSW.
 Jemmy Vincent King of Dogingorogaram. Held in the Australian Museum collection.
 Jenny Queen of Broulee.
 Jerro, Chief of Waverley. Held in the Australian Museum collection.
 Jerry King of Gurah. Held in the Australian Museum collection.
 Jerry Overseer of Woolshed. Wellington district. Held in the Australian Museum collection.
 Jimbalungie King of Werai. Held in the collection of Museum of Victoria.
 Jimmy, King - Brisbane Water.
 Jimmy - King of Wurtimurti.
 Joe Timbrey, Chief of the Five Islands. Held in the Australian Museum collection.
 John Neville - King of Mahaderree.
 John, Chief of Burrooa. Presented by J.J. Howell. In the collection of the Mitchell Library.
 John Piper Conqueror of the Interior, 1836. Bathurst region. Given to Piper by Major Sir Thomas Mitchell. In the collection of the Mitchell Library.
 King Billy, Bungabee Tribe.
 King Billy - King of the Barwon blacks. Brewarrina area.
 King Billy of Gidgie Downs.
 King Billy Lambert of Holmwood King's Plains 1834. In a private collection.
 King Billy, Wooroowoolgen 1898 Richmond River. In the Casino and District Historical Society Collection.
 King Bobby. Presented to King Bobby as a reward for tracking James Kay.
 King Bogan 1840s. Bogan is between Bathurst and Baroo. Held in a private collection.
 King Charlie of Yancannia. Bandjigali (Wanjiwalku) people.
King Charlie (Ngaku language group)  from the region Austral Eden near Kempsey (Macleay River district). Presumably bestowed by John Verge. Held in the collection of the State Library of NSW.
 King George of South Grafton Clarence River.
 King Gundy Sungirrilingong, Lachlan River 1839' believed to be made by Thomas Teely who owned property between Cowra and Forbes called 'Bungirillingong' now called 'Bungerelingong' when purchased by Welsh Brothers around 1900. Plate purchased by Don Kibbler in 1983 in Melbourne. Emu and Kangaroo design to sides, some wear to chain, 24 cm long.
 King Harry Chinnum.
 King Jack Dales Creek Thought to be hunter Valley. Scratch engraved verso 'S (?) Lawler.' Was at one time in the Bungan Castle Museum collection.
 King Jacky Weriss Creek. South West Tamworth area. In the collection of the Australian Museum.
 King James of Baelpin Patrick Plains. Held in the Museum of Victoria Collection.
 King Jetto, Wallumbi. Held in the Australian Museum collection.
 King Joe, Presented by T Icely, Bangaroo Station 14 January 1844. Canowindra district. Held in the Canowindra Historical Museum collection.
 King John Cry - Chief of the Duedolgong tribe, Argyle.
 King John of Wagala. Held in a private collection.
 King Kimby.
 King Mark Cobinbinah Murray River Presented by the Queensland Government as a Token of Friendship.
 King Merryman, Wallaga Lake. South Coast NSW.
King Michie (Ngaku language group) from the region Austral Eden near Kempsey (Macleay River district). Presumably bestowed by John Verge. Held in the collection of the State Library of NSW.
King Mick Alumy Creek. Held in the Clarence River Historical Society.
 King Morgan Casino.
 King Tom of Dunmore, Maitland.
 King Tommy of Tatham.
 King Wagon-Day Black Rock Bathurst. Held in a private collection.
 King Witti of Mudgee. Held in a private collection.
 Kitten, Chief of the Sydney Tribe. In the Australian Museum collection.
 Maggie Barlow, Queen 1 January 1914 of Terry Hie Hie. This breastplate has a partner, see Billy Barlow King of Terry Hie Hie.
 Margaret, Queen of Gundurimba. Held in the Richmond River Historical Society collection.
 Marie Queen of Terry Hie Hi, Presented by Alex Bowman. This breastplate has a partner, see Brummy King of Terry Hie Hie.
 Master William King of Sugarloaf. Held in the collection of the Museum of Applied Arts and Sciences.
 Mickey Johnson - Aboriginal King of Illawarra. Held in a private collection. He possibly had two breastplates, one may have said "Mickey Johnson King". Possibly in the Kiama Museum collection.
 Mickey Johnston. It is unclear if this plate belonged to "Mickey Johnson" and is misspelt.
 Michael Kinsela - Chief of Cudgelbong.
 Mooringally Chief of Nattoi. Could also be "Chief of Natty". Held in a private collection.
 Moororar of Namutch. Held in the Australian Museum collection.
 Mr Briney of Pialliway.
 Mulga King of the Barabinja, Bullan Plains, 1892.
 Mulwaree Tommy, Chief of Cookmai. Possibly in the collection of the Taralga Historical Society Museum.

 Murray Jack / (Malian Ebai) / King of the Wolgal" brass, engraved by C G Roesler, Melbourne, Australia, 1830-1891.
 Mushroonah Aid de camp to the king of Ta-wang-ah. Held in the South Australian Museum collection.
 Native of New England. In the collection of the Armidale Folk Museum.
 Neddy King of Windorah. Inverell district. Held in the collection of the Australian Museum.
 Neddy Noora Shoalhaven 1834.
 Neil, King of Mount Harris, The Gift of Robert Martin Jnr. Coonamble district. Held in the collection of the Australian Museum.
 Nemmit, 1825, Chief of the Sutton Forest Tribe. Held in the Mitchell Library collection.
 New Chum, Harry, King of the Mulgai and Calico Grass. Was in the collection of the Richmond River Historical Society now lost.
 Oombejang Watson Missionary Stockman Wellington Valley. In the collection of the Australian Museum.
 Paddy Nurrang - King of Bergalia or Baragalia (of the Brinja people of the South Coast)
 Paddy - King of Boobarrego.
 Paddy Chief of Wolombi Township.
 Peter Bellamy, King of Yerally, Gindinbar & Gundirimba. Held in the Richmond River Historical Society collection.
 Peter - Chief of Warangesda Mission.
 Pickering King of the Pidgeon House Tribe. Held in a private collection.
 Prince Frank of the Illustrious House of Bogan. Held in a private collection.
 Prince Newman of Tunstall.
 Queen Agnes of Anoora.
 Queen Milly of the Burunji. Burunji is a language name for the people whose country straddles the Darling River in the vicinity of its junction with the Paroo River.
 Queybaum, King of Toogarimbah and Gundurimbah.
 Richard Buttong Coolangatta 1888.
 Robert King of Big Leather and Big River Tribes.

 Robert King (aka King Robert, King Bobby, or King Malawangi) of Gumbathagang, Paddy Gully, Oban & Ward Metake.
 Robert, King of Tatala. Held in the Australian Museum collection.
 Rowley, King of Tomki. Held in the Australian Museum collection.
 Sam - King of Merton.
 Samuel Glass - "Samuel Glass King of Bumbaldry"
 Sandy (or Sandyman) and Biddy King and Queen of Ashby.
 Sandy and Charlotte - King and Queen of Kynnumboon.
 Sawyer - King of Wickham Hill.
 Susan Capps, Queen.
 Taboo Jackie - King of Karara.
 Tallboy King of Moorabie. Held in the National Library of Australia collection.
 Thomas Tinboy - King of Nelligan.
 Thommy Weavers King of Curvy Kangaroo Swamp. Bathurst district. Held in a private collection.
 Timothy - Chief of Merricumbene.
 Tobey. Given by Lieut Smart Toby Mudgee Policeman.
 Toby King of Wambangalang Wellington. In the Wellington Museum collection.
 Tommy. Constable - Wellington.
 Tommy King of Carrs Creek. Held in the Australian Museum collection. A second breastplate was awarded to Tommy at some stage which reads "King Tommy Carrs Creel" and is held in the Clarence River Historical Society collection.
 Tommy - King of Connai.
 Tommy - King of Gongolgon.
 Tommy Lincoln Chief of Euroga Barwin river stamped verso 'Wilson'.
 Tommy King of Ulangmbo, July 1885 & Maria Urangan Chief Barang Tribe. This is a single breastplate with the name of both a male and female on it.
Tommy King of Woronora. In the collection of the Sutherland Shire Historical Society.
 Tony Chief of Merotherie a reward of merit from Mr Wm Bowman. In the Gulgong Pioneers Collection.
 Tumberilagong - Chief of the Nuneree tribe.
 U Robert - King of Big Leather and Big River tribes.
 Umbarra - King of Bermagui, also known as King Merriman. A leader of the Yuin people of the Bermagui area. He was reportedly told the future by his totem, a black duck.
 Wagin Chief of Shoalhaven. Held in a private collection.
 Wild Duck King of Windermere. 1832
 William Darby King of Dabto. Likely misspelling of Dapto
 William King of Wells Springs. Was once in the Bungan Castle Museum Collection
 William Sadler 24 November 1909 King of Illawarra.
 Wilson King of Coraki. In the collection of the Kurrachee Co-op Society Ltd.
 Wilson - King of Coorin Coorin and Cudgen.

 Wollumbin Johnnie.
 Wombail Oouthenang - Chief of Shannon Vielle. Armidale district.
 Womena Oothenang, Chief of Silannon Vieele.
 Wongamar, King of Merriganoury, Back Creek, Konimbla Creek, Lachlan River, John Grant, 1847.
 Yager Chief of Jervis Bay. Held in a private collection.

Queensland
 Ada Derika - Queen of Durham.
 Alick King of the Jumberoos Port Douglas 1909. Held in a private collection.
 Alick King of Montecallara & Moorathulla. Moorathulla is a body of water north of Birdsville QLD, it is believed the Aboriginal people used this site as a camp site in the years gone by.
 Bendy King of Durundur.
 Big Jack King of Roma.
 Bilin Bilin - Jackey Jackey King of Logan and Pimpama was known to roam through the area that is now Logan City, Queensland. He was presented his king plate in 1875. He was the leader of the Yugambeh people and held this position from the mid 19th Century to the very early years of the 20th Century. He was very well respected by Aborigines and European settlers alike.
 Billy Boney King of Poison Creek.
 Billy Coonangul - King of Eidsvold 1857. From the Burnett district. His breast plate is held by the Queensland Women's Historical Association.
 Billy Hippie - King of Minnon.
 Billy King of the Albert. Billy  was an Aboriginal leader in the South of Queensland. Little is known about his historical identity, although he was a contemporary of Bilin Bilin and Minippi and may have played a significant part in the Indigenous history of the Gold Coast.
 Billy, King of Bonnie Doon, Lorne. Bonnie Doon and Lorne are stations now located about 70 kilometres just west of south of Blackall.
 Billy Natkillie Kind of Thundapurthy. Birdsville district. In the collection of the South Australian Museum.
 Blucher The Bowieburrah.
 Bob "Wheelpoolee" - King of Boulia, 193.0 This breastplate has a partner. See Nugget Queen of Boulia
 Brady. An aboriginal man with a breastplate who died at the Bribie Island Mission Station in 1892 and was buried on the beach by the mission's schoolmaster.
 Brandy - Uanda.
 Captain King of Barolin presented by Nugent Wade Brown Esq. for long and faithful service. Held in the collection of the Royal Historical Society of Queensland.
 Charlie, King of Yatton. Held in the collection of the Australian Museum.
 Darby King of Cockatoo.
 Denti King of Torquay, presented by W. Geraghty for His Honesty, 1889.
 Dick - King of Evesham, Darr River.
 Dondally Kind of Rockhampton.
 Dubbo King of Meilmam.
 Fred Embrey King of Mt Mia Station Likivan 1 February 1927. Fred's breastplate was found in a second hand store in Marcoola on the Sunshine coast. It was returned to descendants of Fred Embrey at Cherburg north west of Brisbane.
 George of Saxby Downs was photographed at the Barambah Aboriginal Settlement in 1909 wearing his kingplate.
 Gnarwin King Koko Cama Cama. Relating to princess Charlotte Bay, QLD. There is a glass plate negative in the collection of the Australian Museum showing this breastplate
 Hippi - King of Teraicha.
 Husky 1853 King of the Morton Bay Tribe. Held in the Australian Museum collection.
 Jackaroo King of Canobie Clonclurry River.
 Jackey Hippi - King of Eurella, from the Warrego district. His breast plate is held by the Queensland Women's Historical Association.
 Jackey Jackey King of Logan and Pimpama also John Logan and Aboriginal Name Bilinba (meaning King Parrot).
 Jackey King of Degilbo.
 Jackey King of Langlo Downs.
 Jackey King of Merrill.
 Jacky Cumbo, Texas. Held in the Mitchell Library collection.
 Jagar - King of Barron was a North Queensland Aborigine of the Yirriganydji people. He was presented with his King plate in 1898.

 Jemmy King of Wallum (billa).
 Jimey King of Boondoon, Conn. Bros to King Jimey of Boondoon for his long services and good behaviour, 1892. Held in private collection.
 Jimmy King of Boondoon. Held in a private collection.
 Jimmy King of Juan Juan Emu Creek. Held in a private collection.
 Jimmy King of Portland.
 Jimmy King of Taldora, 1895.
 Jimmy Thompson King of Laura Deighton Tribe. In the South Australian Museum collection.
 Jinny Queen of Friezland 1912.
 King Andy of Petries Creek Presented by Charles Nicols. Held in the collection of the Royal Historical Society of Queensland.
 King Bally Surbiton Belyando, from the South Kennedy district. His breast plate is held by the Queensland Women's Historical Association.

 King Brown Woolumba. Location of Woolumba is unknown. Held in a private collection.
 King Charcoal Johnny of Drayton.
 King Charles the 1st of Noranside.
 King Cobberaball Ipswich. Held in a private collection.
 King Davy Cracow.
 King Dick of Boondie was the chief of the Palparara tribe of western Queensland in the Winton-Windorah area, near Julia Creek.
 King Dourie King of Mount Spencer.
 King Fred and Queen Elena (1881 Presented to) and their children Johana and Rosie by James Campbell of Coochin Creek Sawmills Campbellville in 1881. Held in a private collection.
 King Jack of Bogewong.
 King John of Navena. Held in private collection.
 King Jury Havilah Bowen River.
King Kiara, son of Barney, of the Dalleburra people (born about 1866)
 King Pepper of the Biria - Burdekin River, 1897.
 King Peter of Boulia.

 King Sandy (Kirwalli) of Brisbane. Appears in a photograph by Daniel Marquis (c1870) and in a painting by Oscar Fristrom (1899)
King Tidy of Brisbane. Appears in a photograph by Daniel Marquis (c1868)
 King Toby of Torrens Creek. Held in the collection of Government House in Brisbane.
 King Tommy of Gladstone 1871.
 King Tommy Glengallan.
 King Tommy of Waverne.y
 King Too Too - crack horsebreaker & Glastonbury, coach, groom.
 King of Wonbah. The letters on this breastplate are worn and the name unreadable
 Lava, King, Valley of Lagoons.
 Maria Queen of Childers.
 Maria Queen of Salisbury.
 Major General Latouche, Tambo Barcoo, Queensland.
 Major Prince of Culgoa.
 Minippi - King of Tingalpa was a one-time companion to Bilin Bilin, who died when the two were returning from a trip to Brisbane. He is buried near the suburb of Waterford West, but the exact location is unknown.
 Mr Brodie, King Kooramarow of Yattimbarilla or Connors River. Held in the Australian Museum collection.
 Munda King of Rosedale.
 Neddy King of Gayndah.
 Nobby, not known if he received a king plate, but was described by a white Australian living in Bundaberg as "the King of the Blacks in this district."
 Nugget, 'Billee-ling-oo' - Queen of Boulia, 1930. This breastplate has a partner. See Bob Wheelpoolee King of Boulia..
 Ooranguilea King Koko Wara Tribe. Relating to princess Charlotte Bay, QLD. There is a glass plate negative in the collection of the Australian Museum showing this breastplate.
 Oornquilba King of Ral Mal December 1897, Presented by the Queensland Government as a badge of friendship. Held in a private collection.
 Paddy for saving life 10/4/96 Great Keppel Island.
 Paddy - King of Nive Downs and Duke of Tambo.
 Peter Apony of Ninian Bay Cape Melville by the Queensland Government for saving the life of George Breakenridge from the wreck of the cutter Fanny off Rocky Point, Trinity Bay, on 23 April 1899. Held in the collection of the Royal Historical Society of Queensland.
 Peter Chief of Natal Downs. Held in the collection of the Museum of Victoria.
 Peter King of Banana. Refers to Banana Station in QLD
 Peter - King of Tchanning. current spelling of 'Tchanning'.
 Porlorunki. Presented by the Governor to Porlorunki commonly known as Jimmy Porter of the Taloom Tribe in recognition of the kindness and assistance he rendered shipwrecked crew of the Barque Mallsgate who landed some 18 miles south of double island Pt on 31 July 1889. Stradbroke Island.
 Prince Henry Duchess. Relates to Duchess in QLD, Mount Isa area.
 Queen 'o' Burnett District. This bresatplate is heavily worn and the full recipient unreadable.
 Rueben King of Cabulture Belonging to Messrs Which and Treilian Cabulture is a pastoral run in the Moreton district on the Caboolture River.
 Sam Cubbie King of Wycombe.
 Sambo King of Mount Morris. Mount Morris Station was taken up in the early 1870s and is located on the Langlo River about 120 km NW of Charleville. It had a large community of aborigines from the beginning of its formation, and its King then was Sambo.This plate was made by Mr Hill who was a well known blacksmith in Charleville in the 1870s. After Sambo's death the plate was passed onto Charley, hence name of Sambo was scratched off. H.E, Parry-Okeden was the proprietor, photos c.1901 included.
 Stockman Jack King of Whetstone.
 Taffy King of Thundapurty. Birdsville district. Held in the collection of the South Australian Museum.
 Timmy King of Pialba, Burrum, Wide Bay, and All About.
 Tinker King of Teraiche. Chowilla.
 Toby King of Ravensbroome. Held in the Museum of Victoria collection.
 Toby - King of Vanrook.
 Toby King of Wigton.
 Tom and Lilly King and Queen of Reedy Springs. Applied verso is a label that reads in part, "Tom and Lilly worked for the Anning Family for fifty years. Reedy Springs station is 150 miles west of Townsville and north of Hughenden".

Tommy, Chief of Tully Plains, Tracker. Tully Plains lie between the Murray & Tully rivers, North Queensland. Once held in the Bungan Castle Museum collectionTommy King of Noosa Weyba Gootharaba Tumburrawa. Also known as Barlow Crowe. Held in a private collection.
 Tommy King of Targan. Mungindi area. Held in a private collection.
 Tommy Lazy Pialba.
 Toompani of Amity Point. Rewarded by the governor for the assistance he afforded, with nine of his country men, to the survivors of the wreck of the steamer the Sovereign by rescuing them from the surf upon Moreton Island on 11 March 1847, upon which melancholy occasion 46 persons were drowned and by the aid of the natives 10 were saved. Held in the collection of the Royal Historical Society of Queensland.
 Ulowa King of Wapparaburra for Life Saving 10-4-96.
 Wallingal King Peak Downs.
 Willie Murray King of Doondi. Held in a private collection
 Woondu of Amity Point. Inscribed "Rewarded by the Governor for the assistance he afforded with five of his countrymen to the survivors of the wreck of the steamer Sovereign by rescuing them from the surf upon Moreton Island on the 11th March 1847 upon which melancholy occasion 46 persons were drowned and by the aid of the natives 10 were saved."
 Ye-I-Nie King of Cairns 1906.

South Australia 
 Alice Queen of Mannum. Held in the collection of the Museum of Victoria
 Billy Goat King of Bumbarlo. From the Lake Bumbarlo region. Held in a private collection.
 King Mulga of Coongie Lakes, 1911. A Yawarrawarrka man living in the Coongie Lakes region northwest of Innamincka, South Australia.
 Sawyer King of Wickham-Hill.
 Youngerrow Chief of the Rormear Tribe 1850s. Held in the collection of the South Australian Museum.

Victoria 
 Benbow Chief of the Weirabee 1830-40s. Held in a private collection.
 Billy King of Bonniedoon Lorne.
 Dick-a-Dick, member of the 1868 Australian Aboriginal cricket team to tour England, was awarded a King plate by local white authorities.
 Duke Pollard of Curraburmah. Held in the Museum of Victoria collection.
 Jemmy Curraburma 1843 Yeo Yeo and Mow Poke Creeks.
 King Abraham. Held in a private collection.
 King Abraham, Lodden River.
 King Billy Elengeit, elder of the Waywurru (Waveroo) or Pallanganmiddang, in north east Victoria, is thought to have been awarded a King plate by Robert Brown, owner of the Hume Inn at Albury. The plate reads: 'Billy  Elengeit, King of the Barweegee.'
 King Charley of the Snowy River. Tuna Wanjinata Brabrolung Kraotun Kumai Ngiu Held in the Museum of Victoria collection.
 King George Colungulac. Western district in Victoria. Held in the Museum of Victoria collection.
 King Morpha Mt Shadwell Tribe. There is a photograph of this breastplate in Massola 1971:138
 King Paddy Buchan. Held in a private collection.
 Major King of Glenisla. Held in the Horsham and District Historical Society.
 Mr Ross King of Kulkyne and Mornpool. Held in the National Library of Australia collection.
 Sam King of Merton.
 Syntax King of Brabcut. Carr's Plain district. Held in the collection of the Museum of Victoria.
 Tobacco, tea, Flour, King Charlie, Stockman, Red Hill 1883. Once held in the Bungan Castle Museum collection
 Tommy Bunnberrah King of Swan Reach. Held in the Museum of Victoria collection.
 Watchycann King of the Kulkyne Blacks.

Western Australia 
 Beaufort Dinah - Noongar tribe.
 Chief Leckie - Windarra tribe.
 George Dinah - Noongar tribe.
 Jack Hippi King of Albany. Held in a private collection.
 King Billy of Geraldton, also known as "Left-Handed Billy".
 King Mallee (presented to) of the Gunnedah Pardoo Out Station. Held in a private collection.
 King Mallee of the Nyungar - Danoo outstation, 1881.
 Queen Narjin (presented to) of the Nyungar Albany 11 May 1880. Held in the collection of the Western Australian Museum.
 Queen Rungini (presented to) of the Nyungar Albany 11 May 1881. Held in a private collection.

Northern Territory 
 Billy King of the Walpari. Held in a private collection.
 Jimmy/King of Wave Hill', crescent-shaped, flat in vertical plane, with a chain attached at each apex, 10 cm wide, 32.5 cm long. Wave Hill, one of a string of Northern Territory cattle stations owned by Lord Vestey, was the site of the 1966 Wave Hill walk-off.
 King Arthur. Relating to Old Roltee Creek Station. Held in the collection of the Berndt Museum, University of Western Australia.
 King Pulmari of Nicholson. Held in a private collection.
 Victor King of Alexandria. Held in a private collection.

Unknown location 
The following breastplates are known to exist, however it is unknown what location in Australia they relate to. Many pastoral stations and farms have either been subsumed into larger properties or divided into smaller ones at various times. With this came name changes, with some names disappearing altogether. Some breastplates do not have enough information on them to locate them to any one area. 
 Adam, King of Barcoodilla. Held in a private collection.
 Alice Queen of... Held in a private collection.
 Eve Queen of Wurtimurti.
 Balderoy Duke of Wallandroo.
 Billy Goat King of Bumbarlo.
 Billy King of Ena. Held in the collection of the Australian Museum.
 Billy King of Myrtle Creek.
 Birabil. Once held in the Bungan Castle Museum collection
 Blucher, the Bowieburrah.
 Bobby King of Canargo. Held in the collection of the Museum of Victoria.
 Bob de Robbin. Held in a private collection.
 Bulgra - King of Arremutta, 1920.  Arremutta is an unidentified location.
 Bunjiree between a kangaroo and emu. Once held in the Bungan Castle Museum collection
 Charley King of Birran.
 Charley of Tullungunnully - A reward for merit. Held in the Mitchell Library Collection.
 Coocoogong Chief of the Burra Burrah Tribe.
 Colin King of Wallambata & Byron Plains. Held in a private collection.
 Count Dorsay.
 David Brown King of Aboriginies Bulgeraga Tribe. Held in private collection.
 David Prince of Alamongarindi. Held in the Mitchell Library Collection.
 Duke Pollard of Curraburmah. Held in the collection of the Museum of Victoria.
 Ginningmalong Chief of Talangala Presented by Nelson Tooth 1839. Held in a private collection.
 Harry Mulbah Chief of Berrallawah held in the Museum of Applied Arts and Sciences Collection.
 Headman. Held in a private collection.
 Jackabone. Held in the Australian Museum collection.
 Jackie Kind of Merrill
 Jackie King of the Balgarallung Alternate spelling is Jackey King of Balgaraliung. Held in the Australian Museum collection.
 Jacky Jacky constable King of Toolooby. Held in the Mitchell Library collection.
 James Piper, Thomas Piper constable. Held in the Mitchell Library collection.
 Jemmy Vincent King of Dogingorogaram Doningorogaram is an unidentified location.
 Jemmy Rod Constable. Held in the collection of the Museum of Applied Arts and Sciences.
 Jimmy, L.T.C.E.A.M. decorated with boomerangs. Provenance: Bungan Castle Museum collection
 Jo Bungaree King of the Blacks 1886. Held in a private collection.
 Joey - Chief of Petraman. Petraman is an unknown location.
 John Gillinbong Commander and chief of the aboriginal forces on the Moanbah River. Moanbah river location is unknown. Held in a private collection.
 King Bobby (presented to) as a reward for tracking James Kay. Held in a private collection.
 King Denny Held in a private collection.
 King Fred of Innebonny
 King George Colungulac. Held in the collection of the Museum of Victoria.
 King Wanney, 1861
 King Tommy Dunoarra River. Location unknown. Held in a private collection.
 King Tommy Grinnon Chief of the Muringo Tribe. Held in the Mitchell Library collection.
 Malcolm Chief of Kuruk Mum. Held in the collection of the Museum of Victoria.
Mary of Silsoe. Held in the collection of the Clarence River Historical Society.
 Nurragingy Chief of the South Creek Tribe. Held in a private collection.
 Queenie, 1855. Provenance: Bungan Castle Museum collection
 Ruby, Queen. plus leaf decoration to each point. Provenance: Bungan Castle Museum collection
 Toby King of Ravensbroome. Held in the collection of the Museum of Victoria.
 Tommy of Bungebar. Held in the collection of the Museum of Victoria.
 Tommy Chief of Tartongor. Unknown location. Held in the collection of the Museum of Victoria.
Tommy King of Budgerigar. Held in the Clarence River Historical Society collection.
 Tommy King of Connal
 Tommy Mura Stockman Donna Once held in the Bungan Castle Museum collection
 Tumberilagong, Chief of the Nuneree Tribe

Footnotes

References

External links 

Regalia
Australian Aboriginal clothing